HMS Spy was a Bonetta-class sloop launched at Rotherhithe in 1756 for the Royal Navy. The Navy sold her in 1773. From 1776, or perhaps earlier she was a transport. Then from 1780 to 1783, as Mars, she was first a privateer and then a slave ship, engaged in the triangular trade in enslaved persons. Between 1783 and 1787 her name was Tartar, and she traded with the Mediterranean. From 1787, as Southampton,  she was a whaler in the British southern whale fishery. She made at least four complete whaling voyages and was last listed in 1792.

HMS Spy
Commander Richard Hughes commissioned Spy in February 1756, in the Downs.

In November Spy was under the command of Commander William Bayne. She sailed her for New York on 8 May 1757. She spent 1858 cruising. At some point in late 1758 or early 1759 Spy and Portmahon captured Guillaume. Bayne was also her commander when Spy captured the French privateer Banaba on 29 December 1758.

In March 1760 Spy was under the command of Commander William Phillips, and cruising in Home waters.

In November 1761 she was under the command of Commander Thomas Hayward. He paid her her off in late 1762 or early 1763. She then underwent a survey on 22 March 1763.

Commander William Phillips recommissioned Spy in March 1763. He then sailed for Newfoundland on 22 May 1764.
 
In 1765 Spy was under the command of Commander Thomas Allwright, at Newfoundland. She was paid off in December 1767.

Spy was surveyed on 23 June 1768. Between March 1769 and September 1770, she underwent a Small Repair at Deptford.

Commander James Worth recommissioned Spy in July 1770. He sailed her for the Leeward Islands on 5 October.

Spy was paid off in 1772.

Disposal: Spy was surveyed in July 1773 and sold at Sheerness on 3 September, for £240.

Mercantile Spy
Missing volumes of Lloyd's Register (LR) have resulted in Spy first appearing in the register in 1776. From this volume on, throughout her history and name changes, the register gave her launch year as 1758, and her origins as the "King's Yard, perhaps because she was completed at the Royal Dockyards at Deptford.

Mars
Mars, ex-Spy, appeared in Lloyd's Register in 1780. 

Nicholas Darby acquired a letter of marque on 22 July 1780.

Lloyd's List reported in January 1781 that the privateer Mars had sent into Dartmouth a Dutch vessel that had been sailing from Lisbon to Rouen with a cargo of cotton, rice, etc. Mars had sailed from Dartmouth on 28 December 1780.

Mars then switched from privateering to the slave trade.

Slave trading voyage (1782–1783): Captain Robert Patterson sailed from London on 14 January 1782, bound for the Gold Coast. Mars started acquiring slaves on 30 April, first at Cape Coast Castle, and then at Anomabu. She sailed from Africa on 29 September and arrived at Kingston, Jamaica on 3 December. She had embarked 300 slaves and arrived with 284. She landed 275, for about an 8% mortality rate on the voyage. She arrived back at London on 19 July 1793.

Tartar
Tartar, ex-Mars, appeared in Lloyd's Register in 1783.

Southampton
Southampton, ex-Tartar, appeared in Lloyd's Register in 1787. She then became a whaler.

1st whaling voyage (1787–1788): Captain William Aikin (or Aiken), sailed from London on 31 August 1787, bound for the Brazil Banks. Southampton returned on 20 June 1788 with 18 tuns of sperm oil, 64 tuns of whale oil, and 40 cwt of bone. She had killed 15 whales.

2nd whaling voyage (1788–1789): Captain Akin (or Atkinson) sailed from Southampton on 28 August 1788, for the southern fishery. In a letter dated 1 December 1788 Akin reported that Southampton was on the Brazil Coast in latitude 35°30'S. He further reported on the weather and with news of several other whalers. Southampton returned to Southampton on 12 May 1789 with 12 tun of whale oil.

3rd whaling voyage (1789–1790): Captain A. Muirhead from Southampton on 11 September 1789, bound for Walvis Bay. Southampton was reported in December to have been at Bonavista. She left Walwich Bay on 14 October and Saint Helena on 5 November, and on her return to England report on whales she had left either location. She arrived at Cowes on 30 December 1790.

4th whaling voyage (1791–1792): Captain Sam Marshall sailed from Southampton on 10 July 1791. On 20 August she was well at Porto Praya. Lloyd's List reported in October 1792 that Southampton, Marshall, master, had returned to Southampton from the South Seas.

5th whaling voyage (1793?): Although there is a record that Captain Hart sailed, or intended to sail Southampton to the Brazil Banks in 1793, there is no record in Lloyd's Lists ship arrival and departure data of her departure or return. Furthermore, she is last listed in Lloyd's Register in 1792.

Citations

References
 

1756 ships
Sloops of the Royal Navy
Age of Sail merchant ships of England
Privateer ships of Great Britain
London slave ships
Whaling ships